James A. B. Scherer (1870–1944) served as the last President of the Throop Polytechnic Institute from 1908 to 1920 prior to its renaming to the California Institute of Technology in 1921.  Before being asked by George Ellery Hale to serve as President of Throop, Scherer was a Lutheran minister, one of the founders of the Japan Evangelical Lutheran Church.  He is responsible for the foundations of Caltech and helped bring Arthur Noyes and Robert Millikan to Caltech to complete the driving triumvirate.

References

Further reading
Obituary in C.I.T. News
Judith Goodstein "Millikan's School" (1991)

External links
 

1870 births
1944 deaths
Presidents of the California Institute of Technology
19th-century American Lutheran clergy
20th-century American Lutheran clergy